Nizhneibrayevo (Tübänge İbray) is a rural locality (a village) in Yasherganovsky Selsoviet, Sterlibashevsky District, Bashkortostan, Russia. The population was 287 as of 2010. There are 5 streets.

Geography 
Nizhneibrayevo is located 37 km southwest of Sterlibashevo (the district's administrative centre) by road. Aytugan is the nearest rural locality.

References 

Rural localities in Sterlibashevsky District